The South Asian Football Federation Championship, commonly known as SAFF Championship (previously known as South Asian Association of Regional Co-operation Gold Cup and South Asian Football Federation Gold Cup), is the main international association football competition of the men's national football teams governed by the South Asian Football Federation (SAFF). All seven teams are eligible to compete in tournament.

History
The countries that currently compete in the tournaments are Bangladesh, Bhutan, India, Maldives, Nepal, Pakistan and Sri Lanka. It is held every two years. Afghanistan joined SAFF in 2005 and left the association in 2015 to become a founding member of Central Asian Football Association (CAFA).

The South Asian Football Federation (SAFF) Championship kicked off in Lahore in 1993, evolving out of its forerunner, the South Asian Association of Regional Co-operation (SAARC) Gold Cup. Since its inception, the biennial competition has developed into South Asia's premier football tournament, promoting the regional development of the game. The SAFF Championship 2001 was first postponed from Oct/Nov 2001 to Jan/Feb 2002 due to the suspension of the Bangladesh Football Federation from FIFA; the tournament finally took place in 2003. The 2018 edition was hosted by Bangladesh.

The 2021 edition of the tournament was postponed twice to October 2021 due to the COVID-19 pandemic.

Results

Statistics

Performance by nation

Bold = Hosts
* = No longer SAFF member

Participating nations
Legend

 – Champions
 – Runners-up
 – Third place
 – Fourth place
 – Semifinals1
GS – Group stage
dq – Disqualified/Suspended by FIFA/AFC/SAFF.
Q – Qualified for upcoming tournament
 — Hosts
 ×  – Did not enter
 ×  – Withdrew before tournament begins
 — Not part of SAFF

1The third-place match was not played in 1995 and has not been played 2003 onwards.
2Left SAFF and joined CAFA in 2015.

All-time table

.

Top goalscorers by edition

Overall top goalscorers

Winning coaches

See also
 SAFF Women's Championship
 AFC Asian Cup
 AFF Championship
 CAFA Championship
 EAFF E-1 Football Championship
 WAFF Championship
 Sub-continental football championships in Asia
 SABA Championship
 South Asian Games

Notes

References

External links
 
 RSSSF page on the South Asian Federation Cup
 South Asia Football–Complete SAFF website

 
SAFF competitions
Recurring sporting events established in 1993
1993 establishments in Asia